Dinamo Stadium is a football stadium in Bender, Moldova. It is the home ground of FC Tighina. In addition to Tighina, FC Florești have also used the stadium as a home ground. Opened in 2006, it has a capacity of 5,061 seats. The pitch has a grass surface. Renovated in 2018, it is a UEFA category one stadium. It is one of several stadiums in the former Soviet Bloc that are called Dinamo.

References

Football venues in Moldova
Football venues in Transnistria
Bender, Moldova
Dynamo sports society